The Colored Sounds (. 1989) is the second book in a series of four Alexey Parygin author’s editions.

History of creation

The series [Pesok (The Sand. 1989), Tsvetnye zvuki (The Colored Sounds. 1989), Zelenaia kniga (The Green Book. 1989), Moia mansarda (My Attic. 1990)] was created in 1989-1990 at the Nevsky-25 squat workshop (Kazan Cathedral House, Leningrad) on the basis of the artist’s own poetic texts, the free-verse poems of 1987-1989. All books have similar format, stylistic unity of design, and are of limited edition.

The Colored Sounds (Cvetnye Zvuki) consist of five short poems and a parallel conventionally-shaped pictorial series printed on stencils (blue, black, scarlet and yellow).
In those years, the artist was interested in the problem of synthesis of verbal and visual material in one artwork, so the texts were typed by hand on a typewriter using colored carbon paper (green, purple, red, black and yellow), thereby accentuating the individual elements of the poems.
The title page header is made with cardboard letters cut out and tinted with colored gouache. All copies are stitched by hand (except #1). The cover is hand-dyed fabric with a laconic abstract composition.
The Colored Soundsis a homage to the artist's book Sounds by Russian painter and art theorist Wassily Kandinsky.

Hardcover, no pagination (24 pages). Circulation — 5 numbered and signed copies. Size: 209 x 152 x 15 mm (cover); 209 x 315 mm (book spread).
All the work, from layout to circulation, was done by the author himself.

Collections
 Timofey Markov Collection. (St. Petersburg). — ″Instance #1″.
 In the property of the author. (St. Petersburg). — ″Instance #2″.
 Saxon State and University Library Dresden/ Artist's Book Foundation. (Dresden). Signatur: 2007 8 029473; Barcode: 31480781. — ″Instance #3″
 Van Abbemuseum/ LS Collection of Russian Artists' books. (Eindhoven). No. 8820. — ″Instance #4″.
 Location' has not been set. (Europe). — ″Instance #5″.

Exhibitions
 Die Verwandlung. 25 Jahre russische Künstlerbücher. — Hamburg State and University Library Carl von Ossietzky. Hamburg. December 13, 2013 — March 2, 2014; Kiel University Library. Kiel. March 14 — April 27, 2014; Van Abbemuseum. Eindhoven. May 31 — July 31, 2014.
 Museum "Artist's Book". — Erarta. Saint Petersburg. June 09 — July 09, 2011.
 Independent Art Festival. — Saint Petersburg Manege. Saint Petersburg. November 6 — 20, 2004.

Bibliography

Articles
 Parygin A. B. Мои ранние авторские книги. — Петербургские искусствоведческие тетради, выпуск 67, СПб: АИС, 2021. — С. 232-241.  (Rus)
 Koshkina O. Yu. Особенности языка графики Алексея Парыгина — семиотический аспект // Сборник материалов десятой научно-практической конференции — "Трауготовские чтения 2020". — СПб, 2021. — 304 с. — С. 149-165. (Rus)
 Pogarsky M. Книга художника [х]. Том I. Теория (264 с.); Том II. История (180 с.); Том III. Практика (290 с). — М.: Треугольное колесо — 2021.  (Rus)
 Parygin A. B. Про искусство (в ритме автобиографии) // Петербургские искусствоведческие тетради, выпуск 58, СПб: АИС, 2020. — С. 223-252
 Grigoryants El. Absorbing the Futurist heritage: Vasily Vlasov and Alexey Parygin / The Futurist Tradition in Contemporary Russian Artists’ Books // International Yearbook of Futurism Studies / Special Issue on Russian Futurism. Ed. by Günter Berghaus. — Berlin & Boston: Walter de Gruyter. Vol. 9 — 2019, 520 p. Pp. 269–296. .
 Parygin A. B. Книга художника как форма искусства // «Искусство печатной графики: история и современность». В сб. н. статей по материалам научной конференции Четвертые казанские искусствоведческие чтения 19-20 ноября 2015. — Казань: ГМИИ РТ, 2015. — С. 75-78, ил. (Rus)
 Grigoryants El. Искусство книги и книга в искусстве // Первая Балтийская биеннале искусства книги: каталог выставки. — СПб, 2014. — С. 6-9. (Rus)
 Grigoryants El. Образ текста в современной петербургской «книге художника» и livre d`artiste // Печать и слово Санкт-Петербурга: Сборник научных трудов. Ч.1 — СПб., 2014. (Rus)
 Grigoryants El. «Автографическая книга» в рамках направления «Artists book» («книга художника» // XX век. Две России — одна культура: Сборник научных трудов по материалам 14 Смирдинских чтений. — СПб, 2006. (Rus)
 Grigoryants El. Диалоги культур в современной петербургской книге художника // Книжная культура Петербурга: Сборник научных трудов по материалам 13 Смирдинских чтений. — СПб: СПбГИК, 2004. (Rus)
 Книги и стихи из сквота: Алексей Парыгин и другие // АКТ Литературный самиздат. Выпуск 15. СПб, август-ноябрь, 2004. — С. 21-22. (Rus)
 Grigoryants El. «Книга художника» в современном петербургском искусстве // Актуальные проблемы теории и истории библиофильства: Материалы 8 международной научной конференции. — СПб., 2001 — С. 124–128. (Rus)

Exhibition catalogues
 Die Verwandlung. 25 Jahre russische Künstlerbücher 1989-2013. LS collection Van Abbemuseum Eindhoven (Exhibition catalogue). Auth. articles: Antje Theise, Klara Erdei, Diana Franssen. Eindhoven, 2013. — 120 p., col. ill. — P. 16-17. 
 Museum "Artist's Book". (Exhibition catalogue. Erarta. Saint Petersburg. Auth. articles: M. Pogarsky, M. Karasik, E. Klimova, Yu. Samodurov. SPb. 2011.— 200 p., col. ill. — P. 38.

References

Artists' books
Conceptual art
1989 books